The World Is a Beautiful Place & I Am No Longer Afraid to Die is an American indie rock band formed in Willimantic, Connecticut, in 2009. Following the release of several EPs and splits featuring original lead singer Thomas Diaz, they released their debut LP Whenever, If Ever in 2013 to generally positive reviews. Undergoing a series of roster changes, they proceeded to release a 2014 collaboration with spoken word artist Christopher Zizzamia titled Between Bodies, as well as several full-length records, including Harmlessness in 2015, Always Foreign in 2017, and their 2021 double album Illusory Walls.

The band's style has been variously associated with emo, indie rock, post-rock, post-hardcore, and space rock. AllMusic described it as "atmospheric emo/indie". Their influences include Battles, Caspian, Godspeed You! Black Emperor, and Explosions in the Sky.

History

Early history and initial releases (2009–2012)
The band was formed in 2009 in Willimantic, Connecticut by Tyler Bussey, Nicole Shanholtzer, Thomas Diaz, and Josh Cyr, who remains the sole founding member. In the next two years, they released one demo, Demo 2010 (2010), two extended plays, Formlessness (2010), and Josh is Dead (2011), a split with Deer Leap, Are Here To Help You (2011), and one single, "Gig Life" (2012). Although going through several lineup changes within these years after their initial formation, in 2012 they settled upon a core revolving around Nicole Shanholtzer, Josh Cyr, Steven Buttery, Chris Teti, David Bello, and Katie Dvorak, some of whom would play on their debut album, Whenever, If Ever, and subsequent follow ups.

Debut album and further EPs (2013–2014)
On June 18, 2013, through Topshelf Records, the band released their debut full-length LP, Whenever, If Ever, featuring Thomas Diaz's final contributions before departing the band due to medical issues. Upon release, it received generally positive reviews, and was considered a landmark album in the then infant emo revival movement. The album charted at No. 3 on the Billboard Vinyl charts, due to strong word-of-mouth as the band had virtually no press leading up to the release. In 2014, the band released two more extended plays, Between Bodies, and The Distance, as well as their first live album, recorded with Audiotree, Audiotree Live January 3, 2014.

Harmlessness (2015)
In August 2015, the band released January 10, 2014, a single from their upcoming record, as well as an accompanying music video. One month later, in September, the band would release their sophomore record, Harmlessness, to critical acclaim. It subsequently charted at number 11 on the Heatseekers Albums chart, and at number 46 on the Independent Albums chart.

In November 2016, the band released a single "Body Without Organs", with proceeds going to the ACLU. Founding member Nicole Shanholtzer left the band in 2016.

Always Foreign and Illusory Walls (2017–present)
On August 1, 2017, the band announced their third album, Always Foreign, releasing a single "Dillon and Her Son" alongside it. David Bello said, concerning the writing and production of the record: "When we started writing we were fresh off Trump being elected, so there's an anger to the album that's different from what we've done in the past. There's a lot more resistance thinking throughout the songs – not in a way that's strictly anti-Trump, but also addressing things like white supremacy and controlling elements of the state." The album was released September 29, 2017, to positive reviews.

Founding member Tom Diaz (born Thomas M. Diaz on September 2, 1986) died unexpectedly on November 1, 2018, at the age of 32. On November 3, 2018, the band confirmed his death on their social media accounts.

On August 3, 2021, the band's next album, Illusory Walls, was announced for release on October 8, 2021.

Members

Current
Josh Cyr – bass guitar, keyboards, vocals (2009–present)
Steven Buttery – drums, percussion (2011–present)
Chris Teti – guitar, trumpet (2011–present)
David Bello – lead vocals (2012–present)
Katie Dvorak – keyboards, vocals (2012–present)

Former
Tyler Bussey – guitar, vocals (2009–2010, 2015–2018)
Nicole Shanholtzer – drums (2009–2010), guitar, vocals (2010–2016)
Thomas Diaz – keyboards, guitar, vocals (2009–2012; died 2018)
Greg Horbal – guitar, keyboards, vocals (2010–2015)
Dylan Balliett – guitar, vocals (2015–2017)
Devin Spector – guitar (2010–2010)
Brian Casey – drums (2010–2011)
Nick Kwas – violin, vocals (2015)
Julia Peters – cello (2012–2014)
Chris Zizzamia – spoken word (2014)

Timeline

Discography
Albums
 Whenever, If Ever (2013, Topshelf)
 Harmlessness (2015, Epitaph)
 Always Foreign (2017, Epitaph)
 Illusory Walls (2021, Epitaph)

Extended plays
 Formlessness (2010, Topshelf)
 Josh Is Dead (2011, Topshelf/Ice Age)
 Between Bodies (2014, Broken World Media / Black Lake in the UK)
 The Distance (2014, Broken World Media)
 Death to New Years (2015, Topshelf)
 Long Live Happy Birthday (2016, Topshelf)
 Formlessness 2016 (2016, Topshelf)

Compilations
 Assorted Works (2019)

Splits
 Are Here to Help You (Split LP with Deer Leap) (2011, Topshelf)
 Tigers Jaw/The World Is a Beautiful Place & I Am No Longer Afraid to Die/Code Orange Kids/Self Defense Family 4-Way Split 7″ (2013, Topshelf)
 Sundae Bloody Sundae (split with Kittyhawk, Rozwell Kid, Two Knights) (2014, Skeletal Lightning)
 Fourteen Minute Mile (split with Rozwell Kid) (2015, Broken World Media)
 Sorority Noise/The World Is a Beautiful Place & I Am No Longer Afraid to Die (2016, Triple Crown)

Live albums
 Audiotree Live January 3, 2014 (2014, Audiotree Live)
 Live On KEXP (2016, KEXP)

Demos
 Demo 2010 (2010, Broken World Media)

Singles
 "Gig Life" (2012, Broken World Media)
 "January 10th, 2014" (2015, Broken World Media)
 "Mental Health" (2015, Broken World Media)
 "Body Without Organs" (2016)
 "Invading the World of the Guilty as a Spirit of Vengeance" (2021)
 "Queen Sophie for President" (2021)
 "Trouble" (2021)

Appearances on compilation albums
 Mixed Signals Comp (2011, Run for Cover)

Music videos

References

Indie rock musical groups from Connecticut
Emo revival groups
Musical groups established in 2009
Topshelf Records artists
American emo musical groups
American post-hardcore musical groups
American post-rock groups
American space rock musical groups
Ice Age Records artists